Felicitas Rauch (born 30 April 1996) is a German footballer who plays for VfL Wolfsburg and the Germany National Team.

Club career
In May 2022, Rauch extended her contract with VfL Wolfsburg through June 2025.

International career
Rauch was named in the Germany squad for UEFA Women's Euro 2022.

Career statistics

Scores and results list Germany's goal tally first, score column indicates score after each Rauch goal.

Honours
1. FFC Turbine Potsdam II
2. Frauen-Bundesliga: 2013–14

VfL Wolfsburg
Frauen-Bundesliga: 2019–20
DFB-Pokal Frauen: 2019–20, 2020–21
Germany

 UEFA Women's Championship runner-up: 2022

Germany U20
FIFA U-20 Women's World Cup: 2014

References

External links

1996 births
Living people
1. FFC Turbine Potsdam players
German women's footballers
People from Hann. Münden
Germany women's international footballers
Women's association football midfielders
Footballers from Lower Saxony
VfL Wolfsburg (women) players
Frauen-Bundesliga players
UEFA Women's Euro 2022 players